The Channel Islands Occupation Society (CIOS) is a voluntary organisation that seeks to study all aspects of the German occupation of the Channel Islands and to raise awareness and educate the public about the occupation during the Second World War. There are two branches, one in Jersey and the other in Guernsey, that take turns in publishing the Channel Islands Occupation Review. The CIOS manages many German fortifications and archives on both islands.

Jersey branch
The Jersey branch was set up in 1971. In 2010 it was converted into a limited liability company.

Sites open to the public:
 Battery Lothringen, (underground command bunker, coastal artillery observation tower)
 Battery Moltke
 Strongpoint Corbière, (‘M19’ fortress mortar bunker with linked MG bunker, 10.5cm K331 (f) coastal defence gun casemate)
 Sechsschartenturm, St. Ouen
 Anti-tank gun casemate at Millbrook, St. Lawrence

Guernsey Branch
Founded in 1961, by Richard Heaume, M.B.E.,in Guernsey,  the society still researches all aspects of the German Occupation of the Channel Islands. It has an archive of historical documents, and also renovated the former German naval Signals H.Q, which
was responsible for all messages to the islands from France and then Germany after D Day. 
The Guernsey branch is a member of the Association of Guernsey Charities, and donates money every year to The British Red Cross, in recognition of the help given to islands by the International Red Cross in 1944 and 1945, with supplies of food to the local population.

Guernsey CIOS works with Festung Guernsey and private owners as regards sites open to the public in Guernsey:
 Fort Hommet Casemate
 St Jacques Naval Headquarters
 MP3 Tower, Pleinmont
 German Underground Hospital, St. Andrews
 La Vallette Tunnels

Publications
In addition to the annual publication Channel Islands Occupation Review which has been produced since 1973, the society has published a sequence of books under the title Archive Book dealing with specific subjects such as Archive Book 5 Channel Islands Merchant Shipping 1940 - 1945

Photos of managed fortifications
CIOS Jersey

CIOS Guernsey

See also

 German occupation of the Channel Islands
 Evacuation of civilians from the Channel Islands in 1940
 Civilian life under the German occupation of the Channel Islands
 Living with the enemy in the German-occupied Channel Islands
 Deportations from the German-occupied Channel Islands
 Resistance in the German-occupied Channel Islands
 German fortification of Guernsey
 Liberation of the German-occupied Channel Islands

References

External links
   Jersey Branch
  Guernsey Branch

Military history of the Channel Islands during World War II
Clubs and societies in Jersey
Clubs and societies in Guernsey
Organizations established in 1961